Haliris is a genus of the class Bivalvia of the family Verticordiidae.

Species

 Haliris accessa (Iredale, 1930)
 Haliris aequacostata (A.D. Howard, 1950)
 Haliris berenicensis (Sturany, 1896)
 Haliris crebrilirata (Prashad, 1932)
 Haliris fischeriana (Dall, 1881)
 Haliris granulata (G. Seguenza, 1860)
 Haliris jaffaensis (Cotton & Godfrey, 1938)
 Haliris lamothei (Dautzenberg & H. Fischer, 1897)
 Haliris makiyamai (Habe, 1952)
 Haliris mediopacifica (Kosuge, 1979)
 Haliris multicostata (A. Adams, 1862)
 Haliris pygmaea (Kuroda, 1952)
 Haliris setosa (Hedley, 1907)
 Haliris teporis Poutiers & F.R. Bernard, 1995
 Haliris trapezoidea (G. Seguenza, 1876)

References

Verticordiidae
Bivalve genera